Mount Kurlak is an ice-covered mountain  south-east of Mount Bell in the Queen Alexandra Range of Antarctica. It was named by the Advisory Committee on Antarctic Names for Lt. Cdr. William B. Kurlak, USN, aircraft commander during USN Operation Deep Freeze, 1964.

External links
 Australian Antarctic Data Centre

Mountains of the Ross Dependency
Shackleton Coast